Sokol (Сокол, Russian for "falcon") was a planned high-speed train in Russia. It was to be a successor of the ER200 for use on the Moscow–St. Petersburg mainline, and was designed to operate at a cruising speed of 250 km/h. A prototype was built in 2000 and tested by Russian High Speed Railway Shareholding Co.

The Sokol project was cancelled in 2002. Instead of a Sokol-based design, high speed trainsets (named Sapsan) based on the Siemens Velaro were procured from Siemens in Germany. The Sapsan trains have been operating on the Moscow–St. Petersburg line since December 2009.

References

External links
 High Speed Trains - Sokol  4rail.net

Electric multiple units of Russia
High-speed trains of Russia
Experimental and prototype high-speed trains

25 kV AC multiple units
3000 V DC multiple units